CIRS may refer to:

 CIRS (AM), a Canadian radio station
 Center for International and Regional Studies, an educational institution in Qatar
 Centre for Interactive Research on Sustainability, a building at the University of British Columbia
 Chinmaya International Residential School, a private boarding school near Coimbatore, India
 Composite Infrared Spectrometer, an instrument in the Cassini-Huygens spacecraft
 Interest rate swap, an interest rate derivative